Sekou Cissé (born 23 May 1985) is an Ivorian professional footballer who plays as a striker. He most recently played for Anorthosis Famagusta in the Cypriot First Division.

Club career
Cissé began his career in his home country, but moved to the Netherlands in February 2004 under the advice of fellow international Arouna Koné, who was playing for Roda at the time. Following the departure of Koné to Eindhoven in 2005, Cissé had a larger role in the Roda team and was noted for his speed.

In 2006, it was reported that Louis van Gaal, coach of fellow Eredivisie side AZ Alkmaar, was interested in signing him, as part of an exchange deal with Adil Ramzi. Roda, however, refused to negotiate, stating that they wanted to keep him in their team.

In the season 2008–09, Cissé started to become a very influential part of the Roda JC-team. His performance attracted the attention of other clubs and he was soon linked to clubs like Feyenoord, Eindhoven and Twente.
It was made known on 30 June 2009, that Cissé would leave Roda, to join one of the major clubs in the Eredivisie, Feyenoord. On 5 July 2009, the transfer was officially announced on the website of Feyenoord, after he passed a medical test. It was announced that Cissé would sign a five-year contract with Feyenoord. After suffering many injuries and because of a lack of prospect, Cissé and Feyenoord dissolved his contract on 3 January 2014. After a successful trial he signed a contract on 13 January 2014, at Genk.

Cissé left Anorthosis Famagusta on 9 January 2019.

International career
He was called up for the Ivory Coast preliminary squad for the 2008 African Cup of Nations competition to take place in Ghana.

He competed in the 2008 Toulon Tournament for the U-23 team, which placed third. Cissé was top scorer of the tournament with four goals.

Career statistics

International

International goals

References

External links
 
 
 
 

1985 births
Living people
People from Dabou
Association football forwards
Ivorian footballers
Ivory Coast international footballers
Roda JC Kerkrade players
Feyenoord players
K.R.C. Genk players
FC Sochaux-Montbéliard players
Gazélec Ajaccio players
Anorthosis Famagusta F.C. players
Eredivisie players
Belgian Pro League players
Footballers at the 2008 Summer Olympics
Olympic footballers of Ivory Coast
Ivorian expatriate footballers
Ivorian expatriate sportspeople in the Netherlands
Expatriate footballers in the Netherlands
Cypriot First Division players